Khvajeh Kandi (also Romanized as Khvājeh Kandī) is a village in Ali Sadr Rural District, Gol Tappeh District, Kabudarahang County, Hamadan Province, Iran. At the 2006 census, its population was 252, in 55 families.

References 

Populated places in Kabudarahang County